Planctomicrobium is an aerobic genus of bacteria from the family of Planctomycetaceae with one known species (Planctomicrobium piriforme). Planctomicrobium piriforme has been isolated from littoral wetland from the Valaam Island in Russia.

References

Bacteria genera
Monotypic bacteria genera
Planctomycetota